The mating season is the seasonal period when a female animal's estrous cycle is active, signaling animals to mate

The Mating Season or variation, may refer to:

 The Mating Season (novel), a Jeeves and Wooster novel by P. G. Wodehouse
 The Mating Season (play), a 1969 comedy by Sam Cree whose lead actor in a 1976 revival, Sid James, died on stage
 The Mating Season (film), a 1951 American comedy based on the play Maggie by Caesar Dunn
 The Mating Season (1966 film), a Hong Kong Shaw Brothers film
 The Mating Season (1976 film), a TV comedy film starring Bruce Forsyth broadcast by ITV Thames
 The Mating Season (1980 film), a TV comedy film starring Lucie Arnaz filmed at The Mountain Camp & Conference Center, Highlands, NC
 "The Mating Season" (episode), a 1995 episode of the American TV sitcom The Crew
 "The Mating Season" (serial), a 1975 radio drama serial of What Ho! Jeeves based on the P.G. Wodehouse story
 "Mating Season", a TV programming block on Channel 4 that included the romantic drama TV show Dates (TV series)

See also

 Mating (disambiguation)
 Season (disambiguation)
 
 
 "Dating Season", an episode of Amphibia